Jordy van Deelen (born 29 June 1993) is a Dutch footballer who plays as a right back for Dutch side ZVV Pelikaan.

Club career
Van Deelen made his professional debut for local club Excelsior on 21 January 2012 in an Eredivisie home match against NAC Breda (3–0). He also played for Feyenoord, FC Dordrecht and FC Emmen.

He joined Cambuur in summer 2016.

References

External links
 

1993 births
Living people
Footballers from Zwijndrecht, Netherlands
Association football fullbacks
Dutch footballers
Feyenoord players
Excelsior Rotterdam players
FC Dordrecht players
FC Emmen players
SC Cambuur players
Eredivisie players
Eerste Divisie players